Hexafluorobenzene, HFB, or perfluorobenzene is an organofluorine compound. In this derivative of benzene, all hydrogen atoms have been replaced by fluorine atoms. The technical uses of the compound are limited, although it has some specialized uses in the laboratory owing to distinctive spectroscopic properties.

Geometry of the aromatic ring 
Hexafluorobenzene stands somewhat aside in the perhalogenbenzenes. When counting for bond angles and distances it is possible to calculate the distance between two ortho fluorine atoms. Also the non bonding radius of the halogens is known. The following table presents the results:

The conclusion of the table is hexafluorobenzene is the only perhalobenzene being planar, the others all are buckled more or less. As a consequence in C6F6 the overlap between the p-orbitals is optimal, while in the others it is less, also giving rise to a lower aromaticity in those compounds.

Synthesis 
The direct synthesis of hexafluorobenzene from benzene and fluorine has not been useful. Instead it is prepared by the reaction of alkali-fluorides with halogenated benzene:
 C6Cl6 + 6 KF → C6F6 + 6 KCl

Reactions 
Most reactions of hexafluorobenzene proceed with displacement of fluoride. One example is its reaction with sodium hydrosulfide to afford pentafluorothiophenol:
C6F6 +  NaSH   →  C6F5SH  +  NaF

The reaction of pentafluorophenyl derivatives has been long puzzling for its mechanism. Independent of the substituent, they all exhibit a para directing effect. The new introduced group too has no effect on the directing behaviour. In all cases, a 1,4-disubstituted-2,3,5,6-tetrafluorobenzene derivative shows up. Finally, the clue is found not in the nature of the non-fluorine substituent, but in the fluorines themselves. The π-electropositive effect introduces electrons into the aromatic ring. The non-fluorine substituent is not capable of doing so. As charge accumulates at the ortho and para positions relative to the donating group, the ortho and para-positions relative to the non-fluorine substituent receive less charge, so are less negative or more positive. Furthermore, the non-fluorine substituent in general is more bulky than fluorine, so its ortho-positions are sterically shielded, leaving the para-position as the sole reaction site for anionic entering groups.

UV light causes gaseous HFB to isomerize to hexafluoro derivative of Dewar benzene.

Laboratory applications 

Hexafluorobenzene has been used as a reporter molecule to investigate tissue oxygenation in vivo. It is exceedingly hydrophobic, but exhibits high gas solubility with ideal liquid gas interactions. Since molecular oxygen is paramagnetic it causes 19F NMR spin lattice relaxation (R1): specifically a linear dependence R1= a + bpO2 has been reported. HFB essentially acts as molecular amplifier, since the solubility of oxygen is greater than in water, but thermodynamics require that the pO2 in the HFB rapidly equilibrates with the surrounding medium. HFB has a single narrow 19F NMR signal and the spin lattice relaxation rate is highly sensitive to changes in pO2, yet minimally responsive to temperature. HFB is typically injected directly into a tissue and 19F NMR may be used to measure local oxygenation. It has been extensively applied to examine changes in tumor oxygenation in response to interventions such as breathing hyperoxic gases or as a consequence of vascular disruption. MRI measurements of HFB based on 19F relaxation have been shown to correlate with radiation response of tumors. HFB has been used as a gold standard for investigating other potential prognostic biomarkers of tumor oxygenation such as BOLD (Blood Oxygen Level Dependent), TOLD (Tissue Oxygen Level Dependent)  and MOXI (MR oximetry)  A 2013 review of applications has been published.

HFB has been evaluated as standard in fluorine-19 NMR spectroscopy.

Toxicity
Hexafluorobenzene may cause eye and skin irritation, respiratory and digestive tract irritation and can cause central nervous system depression per MSDS.
The National Institute for Occupational Safety and Health (NIOSH) lists it in its  Registry of Toxic Effects of Chemical Substances as neurotoxicant.

See also
Pentafluorobenzene

References

Further reading
 
 
 
 

Fluoroarenes
Aromatic solvents
Neurotoxins
Fluorocarbons
Solvents